AL2 may refer to:

 AL2, a postcode district in the AL postcode area
 British Rail Class 82

See also
 Futurama#Language